Kevin Tent is an American film editor and director. Tent has been elected to membership in the American Cinema Editors (ACE) and serves as a member of the board. Kevin Tent is best known for being Alexander Payne's go-to film editor on films such as Nebraska, The Descendants, Sideways, and Election. Tent has been nominated for an Academy Award for best editing for The Descendants and won an ACE Eddie award for the same film and received three other ACE Eddie Award nominations for Election, Sideways and About Schmidt. In addition to his career in editing, Tent also co-directed two films, Ultra Warrior (1990) and Blackbelt II (1993), and directed the 2017 film Crash Pad.

Early life 

Tent's early life was spent near Buffalo, New York. He began his career editing educational films, then moved into the world of low-budget horror films, working on several projects with legendary producer Roger Corman. Tent has since gone on to edit many high-profile films.

Selected filmography

See also
 List of film director and editor collaborations

References

External links

American Cinema Editors
Living people
Year of birth missing (living people)
Place of birth missing (living people)
American film editors